Mecyclothorax ewingi is a species of ground beetle in the subfamily Psydrinae. It was described by Liebherr in 2006.

References

ewingi
Beetles described in 2006